Krazy may refer to:

Comics
Krazy (comics), a British children's comic
Krazy Kat, a comic strip character

Companies and Brands
Krazy Krazy, a Canadian store franchise

Music
Krazy Fest, an American music festival, 1998–2011
Krazy (rapper), an American rapper
"Krazy" (BlackGirl song), 1994
"Krazy" (Pitbull song), 2008
"Krazy" (Lil Wayne song), 2018

See also
Crazy (disambiguation)